Bajawa Soa Airport, or Bajawa, Turelelo-Soa Airport, is an airport in Bajawa, Indonesia.

Airlines and destinations

Incidents 
On 21 December 2013, the district head of Ngada, East Nusa Tenggara, decided to bar state-controlled airline Merpati Nusantara from landing at the airport after he was refused a ticket on a Merpati flight that was already fully booked. Two Merparti planes, one of them carrying 54 passengers, were forced to return to El Tari Airport in Kupang after the airport was closed from 6:15 a.m. to 9 a.m. Several other flights were also reportedly redirected.

References

Airports in East Nusa Tenggara